Străşeni TV Mast is one of the tallest architectural structures in Europe and the tallest in Moldova. It was built in 1984–85, and 
is a 355-metre (1165') tall guyed mast (lattice steel structure with square cross section) situated near Străşeni in Moldova used for FM radio and TV transmission.

Transmitted programmes

TV

Radio

External links
 http://skyscraperpage.com/diagrams/?b70728
 http://www.frocus.net/main.php?lng=en&rzd=E-TV&pag=area&g=16#emiter_table

Towers in Moldova
Communications in Moldova
Radio masts and towers in Europe
Transmitter sites in Moldova
Towers completed in 1985
1985 establishments in the Moldavian Soviet Socialist Republic